Rafaelle Leone Carvalho Souza (born 18 June 1991) is a Brazilian professional footballer who plays as a defender or midfielder for Arsenal in the FA Women's Super League and the Brazil national team. Rafaelle played for the University of Mississippi during her college soccer career in the United States and spent the 2014 season playing for Houston Dash of the National Women's Soccer League (NWSL).

Club career
In January 2014, Rafaelle was picked in the second round of the 2014 NWSL College Draft by expansion team Houston Dash. After playing one season, she was waived by Houston Dash, but FC Kansas City acquired her rights the following week. In March 2015 Kansas City announced that Rafaelle would not play in the 2015 National Women's Soccer League season as she was in training with her national team Brazil.

Rafaelle signed with Changchun Zhuoyue of the Chinese Women's Super League in 2016, one of three Brazilian players to do so with Raquel and Darlene. Terms of the deals were not released, but in an interview with Globo Esporte, Rafaelle said the pay was considerably more than she could make in Brazil. In 2017, fellow Brazilian national team player Cristiane would join her at Changchun Zhuoyue.

In 2022, Rafaelle joined Arsenal on a free transfer from Changchun Zhuoyue. She is the first Brazilian to play for Arsenal Women.

International career
Rafaelle played for Brazil's youth teams at the inaugural 2008 FIFA U-17 Women's World Cup in New Zealand and the 2010 FIFA U-20 Women's World Cup held in Germany. Her senior debut came in December 2011 as a substitute in a 4–0 win over Chile at the 2011 Torneio Internacional Cidade de São Paulo de Futebol Feminino. She started her first match for Brazil's senior team in March 2012, against Canada.

In February 2015, Rafaelle was included in an 18-month residency programme intended to prepare Brazil's national team for the 2015 FIFA Women's World Cup in Canada and the 2016 Rio Olympics.

At the 2015 FIFA Women's World Cup, Rafaelle formed a makeshift center-back partnership with Mônica. They kept clean sheets in all three matches as Brazil qualified from their group without conceding a goal. In the second-round match against Australia, Brazil exited the competition after losing 1–0. Rafaelle remained in Canada as part of the Brazilian selection for the 2015 Pan American Games in Toronto.

Rafaelle captained the Brazilian team to their 4th consecutive win in the 2022 Copa America Feminina.

International goals

Honours 
Palmeries

 Copa Paulista Women: 2021

Arsenal

 FA Women's League Cup: 2022–23
Brazil
 Copa América Femenina: 2018, 2022    
 Pan American Games: 2015
 SheBelieves Cup runner-up: 2021

References

External links

 
 
 Profile at soccerdonna.de 
 Rafaelle Souza – 2015 Pan American Games profile

1991 births
Living people
Brazilian women's footballers
National Women's Soccer League players
Houston Dash players
Brazilian expatriates in the United States
Expatriate women's soccer players in the United States
Brazil women's international footballers
Brazilian expatriate women's footballers
2015 FIFA Women's World Cup players
Footballers at the 2016 Summer Olympics
Women's association football midfielders
Footballers at the 2015 Pan American Games
Ole Miss Rebels women's soccer players
Brazilian expatriate sportspeople in the United States
Olympic footballers of Brazil
Houston Dash draft picks
Chinese Women's Super League players
Changchun Zhuoyue players
Brazilian expatriate sportspeople in China
Expatriate women's footballers in China
Pan American Games medalists in football
Pan American Games gold medalists for Brazil
Medalists at the 2015 Pan American Games
Footballers at the 2020 Summer Olympics